Chollu Kanna Chollu is a 1977 Indian Tamil-language film written and directed by T. M. Thirumalaisamy Nadar.

Plot 
A gang of unscrupulous men blackmail and murder Bairawan, a rich landlord. Bairawan's would-be son-in-law, with the help of a friend and a police officer, finally run the gang aground and expose their dark deeds.

Cast 
Adapted from Indian Films:
 Justin
 Asokan
 Ramdas
 Anandan
 Usilai Mani
 Natarajan
 Nanjai Ashokan
 Jai Kumar
 Mumtha
 Jr. Lakshmi
 Vijaya Manohari
 Geetha Chitra

Production 
Chollu Kanna Chollu was written and directed by T. M. Thirumalaisamy Nadar. It was produced by T.R.I. Films, and edited by Gowdhaman.

Soundtrack 
The soundtrack was composed by Bose & Deva, while the lyrics were written by Namakkal Raja and Pattukottai Sivan. The playback singers were Bose and Radha. The songs featured in the film were "Etho Enguthan Erivan" and "Sri Devi Janaki".

Release 
Chollu Kanna Chollu was refused a censor certificate by the Central Board of Film Certification twice, but was eventually cleared with an "A" (adults only) certificate.

References 

1970s Tamil-language films
1977 films